The Independent Division of Yunnan Provincial Military District(2nd Formation) was created on 5 May 1979 basing on the May Seventh Cadre School of Kunming Military Region as a result of Sino-Vietnamese War earlier that year. 

On 13 December 1982 it was renamed as 250th Army Division(), became the last division formed by PLA ground force. 

The division was composed of:
748th Infantry Regiment;
749th Infantry Regiment;
750th Infantry Regiment;
Artillery Regiment.

The division was part of 14th Army Corps (now 14th Army). In September 1985 the division was inactivated and renamed as 1st Garrison Division of Chengdu Military Region() and transferred to Yunnan Provincial Military District's control. In May 1992 the division was disbanded and merged into Wenshan Military Sub-district.

References

中国人民解放军各步兵师沿革，http://blog.sina.com.cn/s/blog_a3f74a990101cp1q.html

Garrison Chengdu
Military units and formations disestablished in 1992
1979 establishments in China
1992 disestablishments in China
Military units and formations established in 1979